Red Valley or Racetrack is a part of the Black Hills in South Dakota. Red Valley is a depression that rims the entire Black Hills.

References

Black Hills
Valleys of South Dakota